Krzysztof Maciejewski (born 17 April 1953 in Pabianice) is a Polish politician. He was elected to the Sejm on 25 September 2005, getting 6,597 votes in 10 Piotrków Trybunalski district as a candidate from the Law and Justice list.

See also
Members of Polish Sejm 2005-2007

External links
Krzysztof Maciejewski - parliamentary page - includes declarations of interest, voting record, and transcripts of speeches.

1953 births
Living people
People from Pabianice
Members of the Polish Sejm 2005–2007
Law and Justice politicians
Members of the Polish Sejm 2007–2011
Members of the Polish Sejm 2011–2015